RS Infotainment is an Indian film production and distribution company headed by Elred Kumar. The studio has produced films made in Tamil, Telugu, Kannada and Hindi.

History 
Elred Kumar was first announced as "a businessman passionate about the film industry" in an article by the Economic Times in 2009, RS Infotainment are the producers of Gautham Vasudev Menon's Vinnaithaandi Varuvaayaa (2010) alongside VTV Ganesh and Escape Artists Motion Pictures' Madan.

After having enjoyed success with their initial ventures such as Vinnaithaandi Varuvaayaa (2010), Ko (2011) and  Yaamirukka Bayamey (2014), their recent ventures have been less profitable.

Filmography

References 

Film distributors of India
Film production companies based in Chennai
Indian film studios
2008 establishments in Tamil Nadu
Indian companies established in 2008
Mass media companies established in 2008